Serap Yazıcı (born 1963 in Ankara, Turkey) is a Turkish academic of Constitutional Law. She was a member of a committee tasked with drafting a proposal for the new constitution of Turkey.

Early years
At the age of thirteen, she lost her eyesight in a car accident with her family, at which her mother was killed.

She was educated in the Faculty of Law at Ankara University, and graduated earning a bachelor's degree in 1984. In 1995, Yazıcı completed her postgraduate studies at the same university, and obtained the title Doctor of law.

Career
In 1998, Yazıcı was appointed professor of Constitutional Law in the Faculty of Law at Istanbul Bilgi University, where she served until 2012. She used to be a faculty member at Istanbul Şehir University.

She was a member of the six-person committee tasked by the then prime minister Recep Tayyip Erdogan with drafting a proposal for the new constitution of Turkey.

She has been critical of the constitution drafted after the 1980 Turkish coup d'état, saying "In the Turkish judicial system, the number of rulings that were based on the principle of objectivity would most likely be in the minority".

References

1963 births
People from Ankara
Living people
Turkish non-fiction writers
Turkish legal scholars
Turkish women academics
Blind academics
Date of birth missing (living people)
Turkish blind people
Academic staff of Istanbul Bilgi University
Academic staff of Istanbul Şehir University
Ankara University Faculty of Law alumni
Women legal scholars